Karanambo Airport  is an airport serving the village of Karanambo, in the Upper Takutu-Upper Essequibo Region of Guyana.

See also

 List of airports in Guyana
 Transport in Guyana

References

External links
Bing Maps - Karanambo
Karanambo Airport
OpenStreetMap - Karanambo
OurAirports - Karanambo

Airports in Guyana